The Columbia Civic Library Association was a professional organization for Black librarians and library workers in Washington DC, known for compiling and publishing A Directory of Negro Graduates of Accredited Library Schools (1900-1936). The organization was based at Howard University. Margaret Hunton, one of the first Black librarians hired at the Library of Congress, was president of the organization in 1940.

References

External links
 A Directory of Negro Graduates of Accredited Library Schools (1900-1936)

Defunct organizations based in Washington, D.C.
Library associations in the United States